

Oneonta Gorge is a scenic gorge located in the Columbia River Gorge area of the American state of Oregon. The U.S. Forest Service has designated it as a botanical area because of the unique aquatic and woodland plants that grow there. Exposed walls of 25-million-year-old (Miocene epoch) basalt are home to a wide variety of ferns, mosses, hepatics, and lichens, many of which grow only in the Columbia River Gorge.  Oneonta Gorge with its 50 species of wildflowers, flowering shrubs and trees has been described as "one of the true dramatic chasms in the state."  The Oneonta Gorge Creek Bridge is listed on the National Register of Historic Places.

There are four major waterfalls on Oneonta Creek as it runs through the gorge.  Middle Oneonta Falls can be seen clearly from a footpath and is very often mistaken for the upper or lower falls.  The lower gorge (a slot canyon) has been preserved as a natural habitat, so there is no boardwalk or footpath through it as such.  Thus, Lower Oneonta Falls can only be seen by walking upstream from the creek's outlet at the Historic Columbia River Highway. To get to a vantage point where the entire lower falls is visible may require wading through water that in some places can be shoulders-deep, depending on the season and the relative amount of snow melt.  The upper falls are about a mile upstream from the middle falls and require scrambling up the creek or climbing down a canyon wall to view.  The fourth falls which is "Triple falls" can be viewed from several vantage points on the upper trails in the canyon.

The trail has issues due to natural as well as human impacts. In the late 1990s, the stream was partially occluded when three large boulders (the size of "pickup trucks") tumbled into the stream.  Subsequently, a log jam has formed in the midst of the slot canyon. This has created a hazard for hikers, which led to a fatality in 2011.

 trails providing access to the waterfalls remain closed due to damage from the 2017 Eagle Creek Fire.

The Oneonta Gorge was first photographed by Carleton Eugene Watkins, a native of Oneonta, New York, who had traveled west in 1851 during the time of the California Gold Rush. Watkins named the Oneonta Falls after his hometown.

Oneonta Gorge Creek Bridge
It is a contributing structure in the Historic Columbia River Highway, which was listed on the National Register of Historic Places in 1983.

Gallery

See also
List of bridges documented by the Historic American Engineering Record in Oregon
List of bridges on the National Register of Historic Places in Oregon

References

External links

Oregon.com on the Oneonta Gorge
columbiariverhighway.com on the Oneonta Gorge

Canyons and gorges of Oregon
Columbia River Gorge
Natural history of Oregon
Waterfalls of Oregon
Historic Columbia River Highway
Waterfalls of Multnomah County, Oregon
Mount Hood National Forest